On 31 October 1954, in Zagreb, Croatia, a tram accident happened on Mirogoj Road, a steep road leading from Medveščak Street to Mirogoj Cemetery. A tram lost control during descent and crashed, killing 19 passengers, while 37 were injured, making this one of the worst tram accidents in the world.

Events
At 8:30 in the morning, the M-24 tram left garage no. 21 traveling on line 13 which was, at the time, the relation between Mirogoj and Šoštarićeva Street (several hundred metres east of Ban Jelačić Square). The tram traveled downhill from Mirogoj towards the intersection Gupčeva Zvijezda. About 60 people had boarded the tram at Mirogoj, having been to the cemetery in preparation of All Saints' Day. The driver released the parking brake and started to descend the hill. Upon reaching the first curve, he attempted to apply the track brake to no effect. He then used the emergency brake, which releases sand onto the tracks in order to increase friction, but the tram was going too fast to stop. It continued to pick up speed until the last curve, near Gupčeva Zvijezda, where it derailed, rolled over and skidded  into a street light, uprooting and dragging along several trees in the process.

People waiting for the tram at the nearby stop provided first aid, along with doctors and nurses from a nearby hospital, while stopped car and taxi drivers drove the injured to hospitals. The department for blood transfusion did not work on Sundays at the time, but opened to accept the tram passengers.

During the investigation that followed, it was discovered that the tram was involved in another accident earlier that day, where it had hit a horse carriage, but later continued towards Mirogoj. A smaller-than-expected amount of sand was recovered on Mirogoj Road, which might have been due to the earlier accident.

Tram traffic was suspended indefinitely along Mirogoj Road as a result of the accident. It was reinstated in 1964, the trams equipped with four types of brakes this time, and suspended again on 15 May 1967 to be replaced with buses. The tracks were removed in 1970s.

See also
List of tram accidents

References 

1950s in Zagreb
1954 in Croatia
Derailments in Croatia
Tram accidents
Railway accidents in 1954
October 1954 events in Europe